Thierry Gueorgiou (born 30 March 1979)<ref name=worldofo></tt></ref> is a French orienteer who has won more than 20 gold medals in international competitions, including the World Orienteering Championships (WOC) middle distance event eight times: 2003–2005, 2007–2009, 2011 and 2017.
In November 2016 it was announced he will become the Swedish national team head coach following the 2017 World Championships.

Clubs
Gueorgiou runs for two orienteering clubs, the French NO St-Etienne and the Finnish Kalevan Rasti. With Kalevan Rasti he has won the Jukola Relay five times (2004, 2005, 2007, 2013 and 2014).

Running for Fédération Française de Course d'Orientation, he made his senior international debut at WOC 1997 in Grimstad, Norway, at the age of 18.

World Orienteering Championships

After his Debut in 1997, it took Gueorgiou 6 years to achieve his first medal. Gueorgiou has said that this was his hardest period in orienteering. in 2001 Gueorgiou came 19th in the Short distance after a near perfect run, which led him to make changes to his technique that would eventually lead him to multiple world championship victories.

His breakthrough season came in 2003, where he won his first gold medal in the Middle Distance. Gueorgiou has since won all 3 individual disciplines, winning the Sprint Distance for the first time in Kyiv in 2007 and the Long Distance for the first time in 2011. Gueorgiou won his most recent Long Distance gold medal in 2015, winning the gold in the Long Distance at Glen Affric ahead of Daniel Hubmann and Olav Lundanes. Thierry has won 14 gold medals at world championships.

Gueorgiou announced his retirement from international competition after the 2017 World Orienteering Championships in Estonia, where he won his final gold medal in the Middle Distance.

Gueorgiou was a member of the French relay team at WOC 2008 in Olomouc, Czech Republic. While running in a clear lead on the third leg, he suffered a bee sting on the back of his tongue. He left the course to go directly to the finish, where he collapsed, barely able to breathe. He was transported by helicopter to a hospital.

Martin Johansson 2009 WOC injury 

At WOC 2009 in Miskolc, Hungary, during the last leg of the relay race Gueorgiou, Anders Nordberg (Norway), and Michal Smola (Czech Republic) were close behind the lead runner, Martin Johansson (Sweden), when Johansson suffered a 12 cm deep penetrating trauma from a stick in his right thigh. While Nordberg ran for help, Gueorgiou and Smola stayed with Johansson. Gueorgiou pulled out the stick, then applied compression to the wound using his own shirt and GPS tracking harness. Gueorgiou and Smola then carried Johansson to a road. Nordberg brought a physician there.

World Championship results

Style of orienteering
Gueorgiou has stated in interviews that his style is "Full speed, no mistakes". Gueorgiou is noted for his incredible map- reading, and is frequently named as "The King of Middle Distance" for his multiple victories at world championships.
Alongside his victories in Classic foot orienteering, Gueorgiou was the 2006 European champion in trail orienteering.

Personal life
Gueorgiou's nickname is Tero and he is commonly known as Tero Kettunen in Finland and Terje Gundersen in Norway. He was born in St. Étienne, and currently lives in Uppsala, Sweden with his partner elite orienteer Annika Billstam.

References

External links

 Nordberg, Smola and Gueorgiou are jogging to the finish of the 2009 relay in Miskolc. Gueorgiou lost his shirt to harness the wound of Johansson
 

1979 births
Living people
French orienteers
Male orienteers
Foot orienteers
World Orienteering Championships medalists
World Games gold medalists
Competitors at the 2005 World Games
French expatriate sportspeople in Sweden
World Games medalists in orienteering
Junior World Orienteering Championships medalists